Hapalla (Hittite: 𒄩𒁄𒆷 Hapalla or Haballa), also written as Haballa, was a kingdom in central-western Anatolia around the middle of the 14th century BCE. Inhabited by speakers of the Luwian language, Hapalla was one of the Arzawa states, of which it was the easternmost. The kingdom of Hapalla existed until at least the end of the 13th century BCE.  It remained a vassal to the Hittites for much of this time. The area was conquered by the Sea Peoples in 1180 BCE.

History 

The first mention of Hapalla is when Arnuwanda I asks for help against a local uprising there. He bestows this duty to his vassal Madduwata, who betrays him by taking Hapalla for himself. After threats from Arnuwanda, Madduwata yields and hands it back to the Hittites.

Later, when the Hittites are retaking their lands under Suppiluliuma I, he sends his army into Hapalla, whose capital is burnt down and inhabitants deported. In 1340 BC, an independent Seha River Land, Mira, and Hapalla are carved out of Arzawa, who only retain their capital, Apasa, and the surrounding land.

The first sovereign known to us from Hapalla was Targasnalli who, after the failure of the uprising of Uhha-Ziti against Hittite monarch Muršili II (1319 BC), agreed to submit again to the authority of Hattuša and therefore was "...re-installed on the throne of Hapalla by the Hittite ruler". From the subsequent treaty of Kupanta-Kurunta, we learn that Targasnalli was still on the throne of Hapalla around 1310 BC.

The second ruler of Hapalla, a certain Ura-Hattusa, who appears in Alaksandu's treaty of 1280 BC, where the Hittite ruler Muwatalli II, son of Mursili, lists the four sovereigns of the surviving Arzawa kingdoms (What remained of Arzawa had been annexed by Mira) mentioning Ura-Hattusa as king of Hapalla. It is uncertain whether the two rulers came from the same family.

After this treaty, there are no more references to the kingdom of Hapalla.

It is now believed by scholars that towards the end of the Hittite empire (1230–25 BC approx.), before the Sea Peoples, King Tudhaliya IV established the State of Mira as the regional supervisor of Western Anatolia, Hapalla most likely as much a vassal to Mira as they were to the Hittites.

Geography 

All we know about Hapalla comes from Hittite royal archives. It bordered to the west by Mira, to the east by the Lower Land, and to the south by the land of Tarhuntassa, thus Hapalla may correspond to the classical region of Pisidia. Because of its position so close to the heart of the empire, it was often paid more attention by the Hittites, which considered it a bit like a buffer between the motherland and its Arzawa vassals.

Kings of Hapalla

References

External links 
 Deeds of Suppiluliuma I
 The Kingdom of the Hittites by Trevor Bryce
 Treaty with Targasnalli, king of Hapalla
 The Arzawa letters in recent perspective

States and territories established in the 14th century BC
States and territories disestablished in the 12th century BC
Arzawa
Former kingdoms
Historical regions of Anatolia